The Samsung Flip (stylized as SΛMSUNG Fl!p) is an interactive whiteboard developed by Samsung Electronics and planned for release in 2018. The device was announced during Samsung's keynote speech at CES 2018, with planned distribution in the United States and Europe. It consists of a 55" screen and a dual-sided stylus pen, available for $2,700. Accessories are available to either mount the display on the wall or attach it on a height-adjustable moving stand. The Samsung Flip is aimed at enterprise clients, similar to the Jamboard and Surface Hub.

References 

Samsung Electronics
Products introduced in 2018